For the purposes of calculating sales, a single is currently defined by the Official Charts Company (OCC) as either a 'single bundle' having no more than four tracks and not lasting longer than 25 minutes or one digital audio track not longer than 15 minutes with a minimum sale price of 40 pence. The rules have changed many times as technology has developed, the most notable being the inclusion of digital downloads in 2004 and of digital audio streaming in 2014. During the 2010s, sales of singles have been monitored by the OCC and compiled weekly as the UK Singles Chart.

Since July 2014, the UK Singles Chart has been based on streaming figures as well as physical/digital purchases, however the OCC still compiles a 'sales' (only) chart.

Best-selling singles based on paid-for sales

As of September 2017, the biggest selling single in the UK since January 2010 based on paid-for sales is "Happy" by Pharrell Williams, which has sold over 1,920,000 copies. As of September 2017, 37 singles released in the 2010s have sold over 1 million copies—the highest number to achieve this within the decade of their release.

Sales figures are derived from the OCC list published on 19 September 2017.

Best-selling songs of the 2010s based on combined sales
From 2014 streaming has counted towards sales (sometimes called "combined sales" or "chart sales") at the rate of 100 streams equal to one download or physical purchase, although the singles chart no longer uses this ratio.  These are the biggest selling songs released in the 2010s based on combined physical, download and streaming sales.

As of September 2017, there were 146 songs released in the 2010s with over a million combined sales, nine of these with over 2 million. In October 2017, "Shape of You" by Ed Sheeran became the first song from the decade to reach 3 million combined sales.

See also
 List of best-selling singles of the 2000s (century) in the United Kingdom
 List of best-selling albums of the 2010s in the United Kingdom

References

United Kingdom Singles
2010s